is a district located in Tokachi Subprefecture, Hokkaido, Japan.

As of 2004, the district has an estimated population of 18,064 and a density of 12.32 persons per km2. The total area is 1,465.97 km2.

Towns
Shimizu
Shintoku

History
1869 – Upon the establishment of provinces and districts in Hokkaido, Kamikawa District established in Tokachi Province.
September, 1920 – Borders of Memuro Town in Kasai District modified, part of it incorporated into Shimizu Town
September 30, 1951 – Shimizu Town incorporates Mikage Village (御影村) in Kasai District

References

Districts in Hokkaido